Founded in 2002, Ruili Botanical Garden and Nanmaohu Park is a botanical garden in Ruili. Located 6 km from the city in Dehong Dai and Jingpo Autonomous Prefecture of Yunnan in the South-West of China near the Myanmar border. The park has more than 5,000 acres of well-preserved native vegetation, mainly monsoon evergreen broad-leaved forest, with more than 1,200 species of tropical and subtropical plants.

Research 
Working with China National GeneBank, BGI and the Forestry Bureau of Ruili, the Botanical Garden is carrying out the Digitalization of Ruili Botanic Garden project, committed to protecting endangered and Chinese endemic plants, by collection, long-term preservation and breeding of germplasm resources. Moreover, the project will carry out the world’s very first comprehensive digitalization and in-depth bioinformatics analysis of a botanical garden. Providing insight into the feasibility and technical requirements for “planetary scale” sequencing projects such as the Earth BioGenome Project (EBP) and 10,000 Plant Genome (10KP) Projects. So far 689 species and 761 specimens have been sequenced with an average depth of 60X to produce 54 Tb of raw sequencing data, and analysis and further sampling is ongoing.

References

External links 

 Virtual tour

Research institutes in China
Botanical gardens in China
Ruili